This is a summary of the year 2023 in British music.

Events
 6 January – Glyndebourne Festival Opera announces that its originally planned 2023 Glyndebourne on Tour season will not occur, as a result of the reduced funding from Arts Council England for the 2023–2026 National Portfolio.
 9 January – The Royal Albert Hall announces the appointment of James Ainscough as its next chief executive director, effective in the late spring of 2023.
 10 January – The Bournemouth Symphony Orchestra announces that Kirill Karabits is to conclude his chief conductorship of the orchestra at the close of the 2023-2024 season.
 13 January – The BBC announces the appointment of Sam Jackson as the new controller of BBC Radio 3, effective April 2023.
 17 January – Arts Council England (ACE) announces the presentation to English National Opera (ENO) of a one-year grant of £11.46M for the period of April 2023–March 2024, following its previous November 2022 announcement of a total withdrawal of ACE's funding to ENO for the period 2023-2026 unless ENO relocates outside of London.
 31 January – The Ernst von Siemens Music Foundation announces Sir George Benjamin as the recipient of the 2023 Ernst von Siemens Music Prize.
 1 February – In an interview on Finnish Radio, Sir Mark Elder states that he is to stand down as music director of  The Hallé in August 2024, at the close of the 2023-2024 season..
 3 February – John Lydon loses his bid to represent Ireland in the 2023 Eurovision Song Contest, with the Public Image Ltd song "Hawaii".  They lose out to Wild Youth.
 11 February – Pensacola Christian College in the USA cancels a concert appearance by The King's Singers two hours before the scheduled performance time, after objections from a group of students, parents and college staff to the presence of homosexuals in the ensemble.
 18 February – Twelve new pieces of music are commissioned by Charles III for his coronation, including a composition by Andrew Lloyd Webber.

Bands formed

Bands disbanded 
 Fleetwood Mac

Bands reformed 
 Heavenly
 Love and Rockets
 S Club 7

Classical works
 Anna Clyne – Weathered (clarinet concerto)
 Colin Riley – Hearing Places

New operas

British music awards 
 5 January – R&B band Flo are announced as the BBC Sound of 2023.
 11 February – The 2023 Brit Awards will be held at The O2 Arena in London, and presented by comedian Mo Gilligan.

Charts and sales

Number-one singles 

The singles chart includes a proportion for streaming.

Number-one albums 
The albums chart includes a proportion for streaming.

Number-one compilation albums 
The compilation chart includes a proportion for streaming.

Deaths 
 2 January – Andrew Downes, English classical composer, 72
 3 January – Alan Rankine, Scottish musician, producer, member of (the Associates), 64
 10 January – Jeff Beck, English guitarist, singer, (The Yardbirds), (Jeff Beck Group), 78
 15 January – Bruce Gowers, English music video director ("Bohemian Rhapsody"), 82
 2 February – Tim Quy, English musician, (Cardiacs), 61
 5 February – Phil Spalding, English bassist, session musician, 65
 25 February – Sir David Lumsden, English organist, harpischordist and choirmaster, 94
 2 March – Steve Mackey, English bassist, producer, (Pulp), 56
 13 March - Simon Emmerson, English record producer, guitarist, DJ, musical director, founder of (Afro Celt Sound System), 67

See also 
 2023 in British radio
 2023 in British television
 2023 in the United Kingdom
 List of British films of 2023

Notes

References 

2023